Bill Plenderleith (June 1929 – 15 December 2009) was a British-Kenyan field hockey player. He competed in the men's tournament at the 1956 Summer Olympics.

References

External links
 

1929 births
2009 deaths
Kenyan male field hockey players
Olympic field hockey players of Kenya
Field hockey players at the 1956 Summer Olympics
Sportspeople from Nairobi
Kenyan people of British descent
Kenyan emigrants to Australia
British emigrants to Australia
Australian people of British descent